Sébastien Caron (born June 25, 1980) is a Canadian former professional ice hockey goaltender who played in the National Hockey League (NHL). He last played for the defunct Hamburg Freezers of the then Deutsche Eishockey Liga (DEL).

Playing career
As a youth, Caron played in the 1993 Quebec International Pee-Wee Hockey Tournament with a minor ice hockey team from Matapédia, Quebec.

Caron was a fourth-round pick, 86th overall, by the Pittsburgh Penguins in the 1999 NHL Entry Draft. During the 2005-06 season, in a game against the Philadelphia Flyers, Caron gained national attention through his great save against Brian Savage. The puck went off the left goal post, Savage then tried to tip the puck in the goal but Caron quickly scooped the puck up with his glove almost on the goal line. Caron was also known for allowing a 170-foot shot by Washington Capitals defenseman Ivan Majeský. He started the season as backup to Jocelyn Thibault and ended it as back-up to Marc-André Fleury. On June 25, 2006, Caron was bought out from the remaining year of his four-year contract with the Penguins.

During the 2007 playoffs, Caron served as a spare goaltender for the Anaheim Ducks. He was not called on to dress during the playoffs.  Caron was included on the Stanley Cup winning picture, and has a Stanley Cup ring; however, because he only played one regular season game, he did not qualify to have his name engraved on the Stanley Cup. On April 1, 2010, Caron was signed by the Philadelphia Flyers. He was the seventh goaltender acquired by the Flyers' for the 2009–10 NHL season. Caron was never in net for Philadelphia during his short visit.

On August 23, 2010, Caron was signed by Traktor Chelyabinsk. He also played for HC Lugano of Swiss National League A, and the Iserlohn Roosters in Germany.

On March 19, 2012, he signed with the Tampa Bay Lightning of the National Hockey League.

On June 15, 2012, Caron was traded along with two second-round draft picks in the 2012 NHL Entry Draft and a third-round draft pick in the 2013 NHL Entry Draft to the Nashville Predators for goalie Anders Lindbäck, Kyle Wilson, and a seventh-round draft pick.

He signed with the Iserlohn Roosters of the German top flight Deutsche Eishockey Liga (DEL) for the 2012–13 season and remained with the team until October 2013, when he transferred to fellow DEL club Hamburg Freezers. In September 2015, Caron underwent back surgery and had to sit out three months.

Career statistics

Regular season and playoffs

Awards and honours

Transactions
 June 26, 1999 – Drafted by Pittsburgh in the fourth round (86th overall) of the 1999 Entry Draft.
 June 25, 2006 – Caron's contract bought out by the Pittsburgh Penguins.
 July 27, 2006 – Caron signed with the Chicago Blackhawks.
 December 29, 2006 – Traded along with Matt Keith and Chris Durno to Anaheim Ducks for P. A. Parenteau and Bruno St. Jacques.
 April 1, 2010 – Signed by the Philadelphia Flyers.
 August 23, 2010 – Signed by Traktor Chelyabinsk (KHL).
 March 19, 2012 – Signed by the Tampa Bay Lightning to a one-year, one-way contract.
 June 15, 2012 – Traded to the Nashville Predators, along with 3 draft picks for Kyle Wilson, Anders Lindbäck, and one draft pick.

References

External links
 
 Sébastien Caron at Hockey Goalies

1980 births
Anaheim Ducks players
Canadian ice hockey goaltenders
Chicago Blackhawks players
French Quebecers
Hamburg Freezers players
HC Fribourg-Gottéron players
Ice hockey people from Quebec
Iserlohn Roosters players
Living people
HC Lugano players
Norfolk Admirals players
People from Amqui
Pittsburgh Penguins draft picks
Pittsburgh Penguins players
Portland Pirates players
Rimouski Océanic players
Stanley Cup champions
Tampa Bay Lightning players
Traktor Chelyabinsk players
Wilkes-Barre/Scranton Penguins players
Canadian expatriate ice hockey players in Germany
Canadian expatriate ice hockey players in Russia
Canadian expatriate ice hockey players in Switzerland